Ezras Izrael Synagogue, also known as the Wołyńska Shul, was a synagogue in Łódź, Poland located at ul. Wólczańska 6 Street. It was built in 1899-1904 from donations by the Jewish merchants including those expelled from Tsarist Lithuania and Belarus area.  The architect was Gustaw Landau-Gutenteger. The synagogue flourished for only three decades. It was burned to the ground by the Nazis on November 11, 1939 before the Łódź Ghetto was set up.

See also
Great Synagogue (Łódź)
Stara Synagogue, Łódź

References

Former synagogues in Poland
Synagogues in Łódź
Holocaust locations in Poland
Synagogues in Poland destroyed by Nazi Germany
Belarusian diaspora in Europe
Belarusian-Jewish diaspora
Lithuanian diaspora in Europe
Lithuanian-Jewish diaspora
Orthodox synagogues in Poland